Schizostephanus is a genus of flowering plants belonging to the family Apocynaceae.

Its native range is Eritrea to Southern Africa.

Species
Species:

Schizostephanus alatus 
Schizostephanus gossweileri

References

Apocynaceae
Apocynaceae genera